Haae was a High Chief (Aliʻi) of the island of Hawaiʻi.

Haʻae was a son of the Chiefess Kalanikauleleiaiwi and her husband Kauaua-a-Mahi, son of Mahiolole, the great Kohala chief of the Mahi family. Haʻae had a brother called Alapainui ("Alapai the Great") and sister Kekuʻiapoiwa I who became a Chiefess of Maui.

Haʻae was an uncle of Chief Kahekili II of Maui and Chief Keōua of Hawaiʻi.

Haʻae‘s wife was Haʻae‘s half-sister Kekelakekeokalani and they had daughter, Kekuʻiapoiwa II, who was mother of Kamehameha I.

Haae was an ancestor of kings—Kamehameha I, Kamehameha II and Kamehameha III.

Family tree

References 

Royalty of Hawaii (island)